The Fresno Open was a golf tournament on the Ben Hogan Tour. It was only played in 1992. It was played at Fort Washington Golf and Country Club in Fresno, California.

In 1992 the winner earned $30,000.

Winners

Former Korn Ferry Tour events
Golf in California
Sports in Fresno, California